The Indian Citizenship Act of 1924, (enacted June 2, 1924) was an Act of the United States Congress that granted US citizenship to the indigenous peoples of the United States. While the Fourteenth Amendment to the United States Constitution defines a citizen as any persons born in the United States and subject to its laws and jurisdiction, the amendment had previously been interpreted by the courts not to apply to Native peoples. 

The act was proposed by Representative Homer P. Snyder (R-NY), and signed into law by President Calvin Coolidge on June 2, 1924. It was enacted partially in recognition of the thousands of Native Americans who served in the armed forces during the First World War.

Text
The text of the 1924 Indian Citizenship Act reads as follows:

Be it enacted by the Senate and House of Representatives of the United States of America in Congress assembled, That all non citizen Indians born within the territorial limits of the United States be, and they are hereby, declared to be citizens of the United States: Provided That the granting of such citizenship shall not in any manner impair or otherwise affect the right of any Indian to tribal or other property.

Approved, June 2, 1924. June 2, 1924. [H. R. 6355.] [Public, No. 175.]

SIXTY-EIGHTH CONGRESS. Sess. I. CHS. 233. 1924.

See House Report No. 222, Certificates of Citizenship to Indians, 68th Congress, 1st Session, Feb. 22, 1924.
The act has been codified in the United States Code at Title 8, Sec. 1401(b).

History and background

US Constitution
Under Article One of the United States Constitution, "Indians not taxed" were not counted in the population of a state for purposes of apportionment. Indigenous tribes were largely considered to be separate nations, with citizenship and treaty rights, so their people were not considered to be citizens of the United States.

The earliest recorded date of Native people becoming US citizens was in 1831, when the Mississippi Choctaw became citizens after the Treaty of Dancing Rabbit Creek of 1830 was ratified. Under article XIV of that treaty, any Choctaw who elected not to move to Native American territory could become an American citizen when he registered, and if he stayed on designated lands for five years after treaty ratification.

The U.S. Supreme Court in Dred Scott v. Sandford (1857) said that Native people could become citizens, although their acquisition of citizenship was by way of naturalization (that is, not by birth within U.S. territory):

They [the Indian tribes] may without doubt, like the subjects of any foreign government, be naturalized by the authority of Congress and become citizens of a state and of the United States, and if an individual should leave his nation or tribe, and take up his abode among the white population, he would be entitled to all the rights and privileges which would belong to an emigrant from any other foreign people.Dred Scott v. Sandford, Opinion of Chief Justice, page 7.

After the American Civil War, the Civil Rights Act of 1866 (ratified in 1870, after the 14th Amendment came into effect) repeated the exclusion, declaring: 
all persons born in the United States, and not subject to any foreign power, excluding Indians not taxed, are hereby declared to be citizens of the United States.

Fourteenth Amendment  
In 1868, the Fourteenth Amendment declared all persons "born or naturalized in the United States, and subject to the jurisdiction thereof" were citizens. However, the "jurisdiction" requirement was interpreted to exclude most Native Americans, and in 1870, the Senate Judiciary Committee further clarified the matter: "the 14th amendment to the Constitution has no effect whatever upon the status of the Indian tribes within the limits of the United States". About 8% of the Native population at the time qualified for U.S. citizenship because they were "taxed". Others obtained citizenship by serving in the military, marrying whites, or accepting land allotments such as those granted under the Dawes Act. 

The exclusion of Native people from U.S. citizenship was further established by Elk v. Wilkins (1884), when the Supreme Court held that a Native person born a citizen of a recognized tribal nation was not born an American citizen and did not become one simply by voluntarily leaving his tribe and settling among whites. The syllabus of the decision explained that a Native person "who has not been naturalized, or taxed, or recognized as a citizen either by the United States or by the state, is not a citizen of the United States within the meaning of the first section of the Fourteenth Article of Amendment of the Constitution".

Indian Citizenship Act 
The Indian Citizenship Act of 1924 declared: 
all non citizen Indians born within the territorial limits of the United States be, and they are hereby, declared to be citizens of the United States.

This grant of citizenship applied to about 125,000 of the 300,000 indigenous people in the United States, the total population of which was about 125 million at that time. The indigenous people not included had already become citizens by other means, such as by entering the armed forces, giving up tribal affiliations, and assimilating into mainstream American life. Citizenship was granted in a piecemeal fashion before the Act, which was the first more inclusive method of granting Native American citizenship. 

Even Native Americans who were granted citizenship rights under the 1924 Act may not have had full citizenship and suffrage rights until 1948 because the right to vote was governed by state law. According to a survey by the Department of Interior, seven states still refused to grant Indians voting rights in 1938. Discrepancies between federal and state control provided loopholes in the Act's enforcement. States justified discrimination based on state statutes and constitutions. Three main arguments for Indian voting exclusion were Indian exemption from real estate taxes, maintenance of tribal affiliation, and the notion that Indians were under guardianship or lived on lands controlled by federal trusteeship. By 1947, all states with large Indian populations, except Arizona and New Mexico, had extended voting rights to Native Americans who qualified under the 1924 Act. Finally, in 1948, the states withdrew their prohibition on Indian voting because of a judicial decision.

Under the 1924 Act, indigenous people did not have to apply for citizenship, nor did they have to give up their tribal citizenship to become US citizens. Most tribes had communal property, and to have a right to the land, individual Indian people needed to belong to the tribe. Thus, dual citizenship was allowed. Earlier views on granting Indian citizenship had suggested allocating land to individuals. Of such efforts, the Dawes Act was the most prominent. That Act allocated once-tribally-owned land to individual tribal members, and because they were landowners and eventually would pay taxes on the land and become "proficient members of society", they could be granted citizenship. This idea was presented by a group of white American citizens, called "Friends of the Indian", who lobbied for the assimilation of indigenous people into American society. They specifically hoped to do that by elevating indigenous people to the status of US citizens. Though the Dawes Act allocated land, the notion that this should be directly tied to citizenship was abandoned in the early 20th century in favor of a more direct path to American citizenship.

Debate
Although some white citizen groups were supportive of Indian citizenship, Native Americans themselves were divided on the debate. Those who supported it considered the Act a way to secure a long-standing political identity. Those who rejected it were concerned about tribal sovereignty and citizenship. Many leaders in the Native American community at the time, like Charles Santee, a Santee Sioux, were interested in Native American integration into the larger society but adamant about preserving the Native American identity. Many were also reluctant to trust the government that had taken their land and discriminated so violently against them.

One group who opposed the Bill was the Onondaga Nation. They believed acceptance of this act was "treason" because the United States Senate was forcing citizenship on all Indians without their consent. According to the Iroquois, the Bill disregarded previous treaties between the Indian Tribes and the United States, specifically the 1784 Treaty of Fort Stanwix, the 1789 Treaty of Fort Harmor, and the 1794 Treaty of Canandaigua in which the Iroquois were recognized as "separate and sovereign". The removal of the word "full" from "full citizenship" in the text of the original bill was used as a reason why some Native Americans were not granted the immediate right to vote with the bill.

On May 19, 1924, Snyder said on the House floor, "The New York Indians are very much opposed to this, but I am perfectly willing to take the responsibility if the committee sees fit to agree to this." After passage of the Bill, Snyder became the representative of some of these Indians.

On December 30, 1924, the Chiefs of the Onondaga sent a letter to President Calvin Coolidge:
Therefore, be it resolved, that we, the Indians of the Onondaga Tribe of the Six Nations, duly depose and sternly protest the principal and object of the aforesaid Snyder Bill, … Wherefore, we the undersigned counselling (sic) Chiefs of the Onondaga Nation, recommend the abandonment and repeal of the Snyder Bill.

With little lobbying effort from Native Americans themselves, two primarily white groups shaped the law: Progressive senators and activists, like the "Friends of the Indians". Progressive senators on the Senate Indian Affairs Committee were for the Act because they thought it would reduce corruption and inefficiency in the Department of Interior and the Bureau of Indian Affairs. Such institutions would no longer be in control of citizenship regulations if citizenship were automatically granted to all Indigenous people. They also hoped to empower Indians through citizenship. 

Other groups for Native American citizenship supported it because of the "guardianship" status they felt the US government should take to protect indigenous people. They worried Indians were being taken advantage of by non-indigenous Americans for their land. They advocated that the government had an obligation to supervise and protect Native citizens. The Indian Rights Association, a key group in the development of this legislation, advocated that federal guardianship was a necessary component of citizenship. They pushed for the clause "tribal rights and property" in the Indian Citizenship Act to preserve Indian identity but gain citizenship rights and protection.

One advocate for American Indians during the early 20th century, Joseph K. Dixon, who had previously advocated for segregated Indian units during World War I in an effort to prevent their assimilation, wrote (referring to soldiers who served in World War I):

Nipo T. Strongheart, a performer-lecturer on Native American topics at Lyceum and Chautauqua and similar activities across the United States from 1917 thru the 1920s, gathered signatures on petitions supporting Indian enfranchisement into the tens of thousands. Some of his trips into Pennsylvania were in support of Melville Clyde Kelly, a supporter of the bill in Congress, who had a district there. The petitions and other advocacy work helped pass the Bill, but he was ultimately disillusioned with the results.

See also
 Native Americans in the United States
 Native American civil rights#Voting
 Cultural assimilation of Native Americans
 Article One of the United States Constitution
 Nipo T. Strongheart

References

External links
 Indian Citizenship Act of 1924
 INDIAN AFFAIRS: LAWS AND TREATIES
 
 

1924 in American law
United States federal Indian policy
Citizenship Act of 1924
68th United States Congress
Presidency of Calvin Coolidge
Native American history
Citizenship of the United States